Myung-soon, also spelled Myong-sun, is a Korean feminine given name. Its meaning differs based on the hanja used to write each syllable of the name. There are 19 hanja with the reading "myung" and 31 hanja with the reading "soon" on the South Korean government's official list of hanja which may be registered for use in given names.

People with this name include:
Son Myung-soon (born 1928), First Lady of South Korea from 1993 to 1998
Kim Myung-soon (born 1964), South Korean team handball player
Ri Myong-sun (born 1992), North Korean table tennis player

See also
List of Korean given names

References

Korean feminine given names